Paweł Wolak (born 26 September 1981) is a Polish former professional boxer who held the regional WBC–USNBC light middleweight title.

Professional record 

Boxing Trainer: Aroz Terrific Gist, Strength and Conditioning Coach: Farrel Brenner

|- style="margin:0.5em auto; font-size:95%;"
|align="center" colspan=8|29 wins (19 knockouts), 2 losses, 1 draw
|- style="margin:0.5em auto; font-size:95%;"
|align=center style="border-style: none none solid solid; background: #e3e3e3"|Result
|align=center style="border-style: none none solid solid; background: #e3e3e3"|Record
|align=center style="border-style: none none solid solid; background: #e3e3e3"|Opponent
|align=center style="border-style: none none solid solid; background: #e3e3e3"|Type
|align=center style="border-style: none none solid solid; background: #e3e3e3"|Round, time
|align=center style="border-style: none none solid solid; background: #e3e3e3"|Date
|align=center style="border-style: none none solid solid; background: #e3e3e3"|Location
|align=center style="border-style: none none solid solid; background: #e3e3e3"|Notes
|-align=center
 |Loss || 29-2-1 ||align=left| Delvin Rodriguez
|UD || 10  || December 3, 2011 || align=left|Madison Square Garden, New York, New York
|align=left|
|-align=center
|  || 29-1-1 ||align=left| Delvin Rodriguez
|MD || 10  || July 15, 2011 || align=left|Roseland Ballroom, New York, New York
|align=left|
|-align=center
|Win  || 29-1-0 ||align=left| Yuri Foreman
|RTD || 6 , 3:00 || March 12, 2011 || align=left|MGM Grand Garden Arena, Las Vegas, Nevada
|align=left|Won vacant NABF Light Middleweight Title
|-align=center
|Win  || 28-1-0 ||align=left| José Pinzón
|TKO || 7 , 2:24 || December 4, 2010 || align=left|Honda Center, Anaheim, California
|align=left|
|-align=center
|Win  || 27-1-0 ||align=left| James Moore
|UD || 10  || June 5, 2010 || align=left|Yankee Stadium, Bronx, New York
|align=left|
|-align=center
|Win  || 26-1-0 ||align=left| Ishmail Arvin
|UD || 8  || January 23, 2010 || align=left|Madison Square Garden, New York, New York
|align=left|
|-align=center
|Win  || 25-1-0 ||align=left| Carlos Nascimento
|RTD || 5  || October 10, 2009 || align=left|Madison Square Garden, New York, New York
|align=left|
|-align=center
|Win  || 24-1-0 ||align=left| Vinroy Barrett
|UD || 10  || June 5, 2009 || align=left|Westbury Music Fair, Westbury, New York
|align=left|
|-align=center
|Win  || 23-1-0 ||align=left| Norberto Bravo
|TKO || 3 , 1:35 || February 21, 2009 || align=left|Madison Square Garden, New York, New York
|align=left|
|-align=center
|Win  || 22-1-0 ||align=left| Chad Greenleaf
|TKO || 3 , 2:40 || September 26, 2008 || align=left|Huntington Hilton Hotel, Melville, New York
|align=left|
|-align=center
|Loss  || 21-1-0 ||align=left| Ishe Smith
|UD || 10  || August 1, 2008 || align=left|Aviator Sports Complex, Brooklyn, New York
|align=left|
|-align=center
|Win  || 21-0-0 ||align=left| Troy Browning
|UD || 10  || May 17, 2008 || align=left|Aviator Sports Complex, Brooklyn, New York
|align=left|Won Interim WBC USNBC Light Middleweight Title
|-align=center
|Win  || 20-0-0 ||align=left| Dupre Strickland
|KO || 2 , 3:06 || March 15, 2008 || align=left|Madison Square Garden, New York, New York
|align=left|
|-align=center
|Win  || 19-0-0 ||align=left| Sammy Sparkman
|PTS || 10  || December 15, 2007 || align=left|Ożarów Mazowiecki, Poland
|align=left|Won Polish International Light Middleweight Title
|-align=center
|Win  || 18-0-0 ||align=left| Jonathan Reid
|TKO || 4 , 2:39 || November 11, 2007 || align=left|Convention Center, Wildwood, New Jersey
|align=left|
|-align=center
|Win  || 17-0-0 ||align=left| Dan Wallace
|TKO || 4 , 2:10 || September 14, 2007 || align=left|Hilton Hotel, Melville, New York
|align=left|Won IBA America's Light Middleweight Title
|-align=center
|Win  || 16-0-0 ||align=left| Edgar Reyes
|TKO || 2 , 2:05 || July 14, 2007 || align=left|Boardwalk Hall, Atlantic City, New Jersey
|align=left|
|-align=center
|Win  || 15-0-0 ||align=left| Anthony Little
|RTD || 2  || May 18, 2007 || align=left|Beacon Theatre, New York, New York
|align=left|
|-align=center
|Win  || 14-0-0 ||align=left| Keith Sims
|TKO || 2 , 3:00 || March 23, 2007 || align=left|Huntington Townhouse, Huntington Station, New York
|align=left|
|-align=center

References

External links

1981 births
Middleweight boxers
Light-middleweight boxers
Living people
People from Dębica
Sportspeople from Podkarpackie Voivodeship
Polish male boxers